Arsenyevsky (masculine), Arsenyevskaya (feminine), or Arsenyevskoye (neuter) may refer to:
Arsenyevsky District, a district of Tula Oblast, Russia
Arsenyevsky Urban Okrug, a municipal formation in Primorsky Krai, Russia, into which the town of Arsenyev is incorporated

See also
Arsenyev (disambiguation)
Arsenyevo